Johnson v Agnew [1980] AC 367 is a landmark English contract law case on the date for assessing damages. Lord Wilberforce decided that the date appropriate is the date of breach, or when a contracting party could reasonably be aware of a breach.

Five major principles it laid down were,

termination for breach of contract is "prospective", not "retrospective"; i.e. repudiatory breach of contract discharges both parties from future performance of their contractual obligations, but leaves their accrued rights intact (and themselves open to damages)
a claimant for specific performance does not forfeit his right to terminate the contract by accepting a defendant's repudiatory breach
when a specific performance decree is made, a court oversees performance, and it has the sole jurisdiction to determine whether that obligation can be discharged
common law damages are assessed at the date of the breach of the contract, though the court may fix another date if justice requires
the same principles for awarding common law damages applies to awarding equitable damages under s 50 Supreme Court Act 1981

Facts
The 'commonplace, indeed routine' facts were that Mrs Adeline Agnew twice failed to complete purchase of Michael and Renee Johnson's farm, Scheepcote Grange, Woodburn Common, Buckinghamshire. She had contracted to buy the farm on 1 November 1973 for £117,000. When everything was ready in December and January 1974, she did nothing. Meanwhile, the Johnsons were in financial trouble. They were in arrears on mortgage repayments. In March 1974 they claimed specific performance of the contract, and won summary judgment in June, but the order was not drawn up until November, and so the Johnsons left it, because in the meantime, the mortgagees had won orders for possession and sale of the property. The Johnsons' lawyer advised there was no point enforcing against Agnew. The mortgagees only realised £48,000, not even enough to discharge the Johnsons' mortgage debts. The Johnsons' creditors filed them into bankruptcy. This was adjourned, and the Johnsons' brought a claim against Agnew seeking the purchase price (less deposit and the £48,000 realised on sale by the mortgagees), and a declaration that the contract was repudiated and to keep the deposit price.

Judgment
Lord Wilberforce said,

On the prospective nature of a repudiatory breach, he said this.

See also
Breach of contract
Hillel v Christoforides (1991) 63 P&CR 301 (ChD)
Jaggard v Sawyer [1994] EWCA Civ 1
Hurst v Bryk [2000] UKHL 19, [2002] 1 AC 185
Capital and Suburban Properties Ltd v Swycher [1976] 1 Ch 319

Notes

References
C Mitchell, 'Johnson v Agnew (1974)' in C Mitchell and P Mitchell (eds), Landmark Cases in the Law of Contract (Hart, Oxford 2008) ch 12, 351-373

Lord Wilberforce cases
English remedy case law
House of Lords cases
1980 in British law
1980 in case law